Gibbon Glade is an unincorporated community in Fayette County, Pennsylvania, United States. Gibbon Glade has a post office, with ZIP code 15440, which opened on February 8, 1870.

References

Unincorporated communities in Fayette County, Pennsylvania
Unincorporated communities in Pennsylvania